The Braunschweig tramway network is a network of tramways forming part of the public transport system in Braunschweig, a city in the federal state of Lower Saxony, Germany.

These lines originally had the letter M before the number, however this was stopped.

See also
List of town tramway systems in Germany
Trams in Germany

References

External links
 
 Track plan of the Braunschweig tram system
 
 

Braunschweig
Transport in Braunschweig
1100 mm gauge railways in Germany
600 V DC railway electrification
Braunschweig